The Tigil is a river on the western side of the Kamchatka Peninsula. It flows into the Sea of Okhotsk. The Cossack Luka Morozko was the first European to reach it in 1696. The village Tigil lies on the river Tigil.

References

Rivers of Kamchatka Krai
Drainage basins of the Sea of Okhotsk